COFEPOSA or the Conservation of Foreign Exchange and Prevention of Smuggling Activities Act is an Act of Parliament passed in 1974 during  administration of Indira Gandhi, trying to retain foreign currency and prevent smuggling. It was an economic adjunct to the controversial Maintenance of Internal Security Act (MISA) which was enacted in 1971. Though MISA was repealed in 1978, this law is still in force. COFEPOSA Act 1974 prescribes that the appropriate government shall establish advisory boards to assist the government on matters related to the detention of persons and prepare reports regarding the same. According to this section, the appropriate Government shall form an advisory board to perform the functions mentioned in clauses (4)(a) and (7)(c) of Article 22.

References

External links
COFEPOSA articles from the Times of India

Indian business law
Economic history of India (1947–present)
Acts of the Parliament of India 1974
Smuggling in India
Indira Gandhi administration
Financial history of India